is a Georgian professional sumo wrestler from Mtskheta. He is a member of the Kasugano stable and made his professional debut in March 2006. He reached the top makuuchi division just two years later in May 2008.  After a long hiatus due to injury, he began his comeback from the rank of makushita 55 in March 2014, logging four championships in a row in lower divisions on his way back to the top division in November 2014. He has eleven special prizes, six for Fighting Spirit, three for Technique, and two for Outstanding Performance, as well as two kinboshi or gold stars for defeating yokozuna. In January 2018 he took his first top-division yūshō (championship). In May 2018, after finishing as runner-up with a 13–2 record and a total of 37 wins in his last three tournaments, he was promoted to ōzeki. He was demoted to sekiwake after posting losing records in the first two tournaments of 2019, but returned to ōzeki after winning ten matches at the May 2019 basho. He lost the ōzeki rank again after the September 2019 tournament, and lost his top division status after the January 2023 tournament.

Early life and sumo background
As a teenager Gorgadze practiced judo and sambo.
He competed in amateur sumo at the World Junior Championships in 2004, held in Osaka, Japan and at the World Championships in 2005. He trained at the prestigious Nichidai sumo club at Nihon University and it was a member of that club who encouraged him to turn professional. In his early days in Japan he suffered from homesickness and had to deal with his grandmother being killed and his father seriously injured in an accident.

Career
At the beginning of 2006 he was recruited by the former sekiwake Tochinowaka of Kasugano stable. The stable had not had a foreigner since the Taiwanese wrestler Tochinohana retired in 1988, but agreed to take on Gorgadze just as his tourist visa was about to expire. After eleven straight kachi-koshi or winning scores he gained sekitori status in January 2008 upon promotion to the jūryō division and immediately took the yūshō or championship in that division with a 12–3 record.

Promotion to maegashira

He took his first ever make-koshi or losing score in his top division debut in May 2008, but still won enough bouts to remain in the division. He reached  maegashira 4 in November 2008, but facing the highest ranking men for the first time he could only record three wins against twelve losses. However, in July 2009 he produced a good score of 9–6 at maegashira 5, and was promoted to the rank of maegashira 1 in the September tournament. He could manage only four wins there, but he performed much better in November, finishing runner-up to Hakuhō at 12–3 and winning his first special prize, Fighting Spirit. However, his defeat to Hokutōriki on the final day cost him a chance of making his debut in the titled san'yaku ranks in January 2010.

In the May 2010 tournament he defeated four ōzeki in a row from Days 2 to 5 (becoming only the second man below sekiwake to achieve this, following Masurao in March 1987) and won his second Fighting Spirit prize (shared with Aran). He was rewarded with promotion to komusubi for the first time in the July 2010 tournament. He fell short with a 6–9 record, but returned to komusubi in November.

In May 2011 he equalled his best ever top division performance, once again finishing runner-up to Hakuho on 12–3 and winning another Fighting Spirit prize. This saw him return to the komusubi rank for the July 2011 tournament. His poor performance in November, scoring only 2–13, could be attributed to the fact that he was banned from training before the tournament by his stablemaster as punishment for breaking heya rules on curfew and wearing Western style clothes in public. Tochinoshin was one of three wrestlers at the stable who were beaten with a golf club during this incident, for which his stablemaster was given a warning by the Japan Sumo Association. He made komusubi for the fourth time in September 2012.

Falling to makushita
Tochinoshin suffered an anterior cruciate ligament injury in the July 2013 tournament, resulting in him missing the next three tournaments and falling from the maegashira ranks to the unsalaried makushita division. In March 2014, fighting from makushita 55, he bounced back with a 7–0 perfect championship.  He followed this in the very next tournament in May with a consecutive 7–0 championship in at makushita 6, thereby guaranteeing his re-promotion to the salaried ranks of jūryō. He continued his comeback in fine style by winning two consecutive jūryō championships, the first after a playoff win over Ichinojō and the second with a perfect 15–0 score (only the third time since the six tournaments a year system began in 1958 that the latter had occurred). Returning to the top division in November 2014, he scored 11–4 and picked up his fourth Fighting Spirit Award. In 2015 he won six times in January but in March his eight victories included a win over the yokozuna Harumafuji, earning him his first kinboshi. Winning records in May and July at maegashira 1 saw him promoted to komusubi for the September tournament for the first time in three years. Having fought his way back to san'yaku from makushita 55, Tochinoshin is in first place for the lowest rank fallen before a successful return to the komusubi rank since World War II. In September 2015 he maintained his rank with a 10–5 record and received his fifth Fighting Spirit prize.  He scored only 7–8 in the following November tournament but managed to stay at komusubi, although he fell to the maegashira ranks after a 6–9 in January. In the May 2016 tournament he received his first Technique Prize, and earned promotion to the third highest rank of sekiwake for the first time in the following July tournament. Losing records in July and September saw him drop down the rankings but he returned to komusubi yet again after a 10–5 in November. In January 2017 he lost his first five bouts before withdrawing from the tournament with a knee injury. He had an excellent showing in the July 2017 tournament, which resulted in his being promoted to maegashira 1 for the September tournament, but an aggravation of his knee injury resulted him only achieving four wins against eleven losses in September.

Top division championship and promotion to ōzeki
In January 2018, fighting at maegashira 3, Tochinoshin won twelve of his first thirteen matches, thereby ensuring that he would, at least, enter a play-off for the championship and that he needed only one win from his last two bouts to secure the championship outright. Before his penultimate match he received a message of support from the Georgian Prime Minister Giorgi Kvirikashvili. On the fourteenth day he claimed his first top division title with a yorikiri win over Shōhōzan, becoming the first man from Georgia to do so. It was the first top division championship for Kasugano stable in 46 years, since Tochiazuma Tomoyori in January 1972. His achievement brought some good news for the stable after it had emerged earlier in the tournament that Kasugano Oyakata was being sued over an assault at the stable in 2014. Tochinoshin, who wrestles in his stablemaster's old mawashi, embraced Kasugano after his victory on Day 14 and later told reporters, "several years ago he told me that he would clutch me to his chest if I won... I was so glad that I made it come true."
In February 2018 he was awarded Georgia's Medal of Honour, for the promotion of his country abroad. Tochinoshin returned to the sekiwake rank for the March 2018 tournament for the first time since his single appearance at the rank in September 2016.  In the March Tournament in Osaka, Tochinoshin started out slow with a record of 2–2 in the first four days. He would then go on to win his next five matches, before losing the following two against both ōzeki. On Day 12, Tochinoshin won against yokozuna Kakuryū ending his undefeated record. Tochinoshin finished the tournament with a 10–5 record to keep his hopes of being promoted to ōzeki alive. He was also awarded the Outstanding Performance prize for achieving a winning record and having defeated Kakuryū the tournament champion and yokozuna.

Tochinoshin won his first 12 matches in the May tournament, including a win over yokozuna Hakuhō on Day 12 which was his first victory against him in 26 attempts. He eventually finished the tournament 13–2 and runner-up to yokozuna Kakuryū, earning the Fighting Spirit and Technique prizes in the process. Having won 37 bouts over the last 3 tournaments, including 1 yūshō, his promotion to ōzeki was all but certain. The promotion was finalized during an extraordinary meeting of the Sumo Association on May 29, and the following day it was officially announced. He became the eleventh foreign-born wrestler to reach ōzeki, and the 60 tournaments it took him from his debut in the top division ties the record for the slowest ever, alongside Masuiyama II. He is only the second wrestler since the start of the Showa era to fall from makuuchi to makushita and subsequently make ōzeki, after Kotokaze. He was the first wrestler from Kasugano stable to reach ōzeki since the double promotion of Tochinoumi and Tochihikari in May 1962. He returned to Georgia after the announcement for the first time in a year, and met Georgian president Giorgi Margvelashvili. In June 2018 he was awarded the title of Knight seen as the highest honor in the Georgian sports world.

Ōzeki career and demotion
Tochinoshin won his first five bouts in his ōzeki debut but then injured his right big toe in a defeat to Tamawashi on Day 6 and was forced to withdraw from the tournament. He was kadoban, or in danger of demotion from ōzeki, for the September 2018 tournament, the first time in 18 years (since Miyabiyama in the September 2000 tournament) that a wrestler has been kadoban in only his second ōzeki tournament. In September he still seemed below his best form but saved his ōzeki status with a win over Abi on day 14 and defeated Takayasu in his final match to end on 9–6. Going into the final tournament of the year Tochinoshin was tied with Kakuryū for the most wins in 2018, with 51. With Kakuryū not participating in the tournament, Tochinoshin's 8–7 score in November was enough to give him the record with 59 wins in 2018.

Tochinoshin withdrew from the January 2019 tournament on Day 5 having suffered four straight defeats, due to a thigh injury he picked up in training shortly before the tournament.  At the March 2019 tournament Tochinoshin finished with seven wins and eight losses, and was demoted to sekiwake for the May tournament after two losing records in succession.

On Day 13 of the May 2019 tournament, Tochinoshin was initially declared the winner over eventual champion Asanoyama, but the ruling of the gyōji was reversed by the shimpan in what was viewed by some as a controversial decision. Tochinoshin would win the next day without incident to secure his tenth victory of the basho. His ōzeki rank was officially restored for the July 2019 tournament, making him the fifth sumo wrestler since 1969 to be promoted back to ōzeki after just being demoted to sekiwake, and the first since Tochiazuma who accomplished the feat twice in 2004 and 2005. He withdrew from the July tournament on Day 6 having suffered five straight losses, citing knee and shoulder injuries. In September he managed only six wins and was demoted from ōzeki for the second time. He withdrew from the November tournament on Day 5 after fracturing a rib in defeating Takarafuji on the previous day. This ended his hopes of winning ten bouts and making an immediate return to ōzeki, and he dropped to the maegashira ranks for the January 2020 tournament.

Tochinoshin withdrew from the first four days of the November 2021 tournament due to lower back pain.  He was facing demotion to jūryō at that point, but managed to return to the tournament and win six matches. In March 2022 he produced his first winning record since November 2020, reaching 8–3 on Day 11 by defeating Terutsuyoshi with a trademark  or lift out. This ended a run of seven straight losing records.

Tochinoshin withdrew on the fifth day of the January 2023 tournament after dislocating his left shoulder in his Day 4 match against Kotoshōhō. He was subsequently demoted to jūryō for the next basho, ending a streak of 49 tournaments in the top division. Tochinoshin became seventh former Ozeki who suffered demotion to jūryō after Asanoyama.

Family
Tochinoshin was married in January 2016 to a childhood friend. His first child, a girl named Anastasia, was born in Georgia in November 2017. His wife and daughter were still in Georgia at the time of his tournament victory in January 2018 and Tochinoshin told reporters that because of his sumo commitments he would not have time to visit them until May.

Fighting style
Tochinoshin favours yotsu-sumo techniques, preferring to grapple with rather than push his opponents. His stablemaster urged him to concentrate on traditional forward moving sumo, in contrast to other European and Russian sumo wrestlers of the time who specialized in pulling techniques. His favourite grip on the mawashi is migi-yotsu, meaning he likes his right hand inside and his left hand outside his opponent's arms. His most common winning technique or kimarite is yori kiri or force out, but he also uses his left hand grip to good effect by regularly employing uwatenage, or overarm throw. He is well known for his strength, and his muscular physique, with his thighs being measured at 90 cm around.

Career record

See also
List of sumo tournament top division champions
List of sumo tournament top division runners-up
List of sumo tournament second division champions
List of active gold star earners
Glossary of sumo terms
List of active sumo wrestlers
List of non-Japanese sumo wrestlers
List of ōzeki
Active special prize winners

References

External links

 
 Tochinoshin on Twitter

1987 births
People from Mtskheta
Living people
Expatriate sportspeople from Georgia (country) in Japan
Sumo wrestlers from Georgia (country)
Ōzeki
Nihon University alumni
Recipients of the Order of Honor (Georgia)